Gentian Çela (born 9 February 1981, in Lushnjë) is an Albanian footballer who currently plays as a midfielder for KS Lushnja in the Albanian Superliga.

References

1981 births
Living people
Sportspeople from Lushnjë
Albanian footballers
Association football defenders
Taranto F.C. 1927 players
KS Lushnja players
KS Shkumbini Peqin players
Besa Kavajë players
Kategoria Superiore players
Albanian expatriate footballers
Expatriate footballers in Italy
Albanian expatriate sportspeople in Italy